Katangar gabari is a town in Jigawa State of Nigeria. It is located 20 km away from Kiyawa and 13 km from Dutse.  town has a total population of 7000 people.

Dividing of Katanga Town in to Two 
On 20 November katanga town was divided in two, Katanga Kudu and Katanga Arewa, By Dutse Emirate Council. under the command of the emire Alhaji DR Nuhu Muhammad Sunusi.

People in Katanga 
Many people in Katanga are Hausa. About 90% of the population are Hausa, 7.5% are Fulani and 2.5% Kanuri.

Farming in Katanga 
Katanga are the food producers not only in Jigawa state but in all Nigeria. During the rain season people of Katanga are found seeding farming crops e.g. like millet, corn, rice, groundnut, beans, and maize. In the dry season farmers in Katanga make their way to the pond for irrigation and seeding watermelons, sweat melons, tomatoes, pepe and wheats.

References

Populated places in Jigawa State